Prince Carlo of Bourbon-Two Sicilies, Duke of Castro (born 24 February 1963) is one of the two claimants to the headship of the former House of Bourbon-Two Sicilies.

Early life
Prince Carlo was born at Saint-Raphaël, Var, France, as the only son of Ferdinand, Duke of Castro, and his wife, Chantal de Chevron-Villette.

Marriage and issue
On 31 October 1998, Prince Carlo married Camilla Crociani, daughter of Italian billionaire Camillo Crociani and his second wife, Italian actress Edy Vessel. Together Carlo and Camilla have two children:
 Princess Maria Carolina, Duchess of Calabria, Duchess of Palermo (born 2003)
 Princess Maria Chiara, Duchess of Noto, Duchess of Capri (born 2005)

Claimed headship of the House of Bourbon-Two Sicilies
In 2008, Carlo succeeded to his father's claim as head of the House of the Two Sicilies and use of the title Duke of Castro. This claim is disputed by the Spanish branch of the House of the Two Sicilies. As claimant to the headship of the house, he thus also claims to be sovereign of the Sacred Military Constantinian Order of Saint George as well as the Royal Order of Francis I.

The dispute between the Castroan and Spanish branches of the family began after the death of the last uncontested head of the house, Ferdinand Pius, in 1960. By male primogeniture, the immediate male heir of Ferdinand Pius was his nephew Infante Alfonso, the son of Pius's eldest younger brother Carlos. Carlos married María de las Mercedes, Princess of Asturias, the heir presumptive of Spain, in 1901. As a result of the marriage, his family forced Carlos to renounce his "eventual succession to the crown" of the Two Sicilies, in line with the centuries-old agreement that the crowns of Spain and Two Sicilies were not to unify. Although this renunciation was interpreted by some as removing Carlos and his descendants from the line of succession of the Two Sicilies, supporters of Alfonso argued that the renunciation would only have applied if Carlos's wife or an eventual son had actually become the sovereign of Spain, which did not happen and would have most likely not happened at the time of the signing regardless. Nevertheless, Ferdinand Pius's and Carlos's younger brother, Ranieri, began to regard himself as Pius's heir. Upon Pius's death, both Ranieri and Alfonso claimed to be the legitimate heads of the family. 

Alfonso's line of the family (today represented by Carlo's rival claimant, Pedro) has been officially recognized as the legitimate line by the Government of Spain, the Spanish royal house, the Parmesan royal house and the Portuguese royal house, whereas Ranieri's line was recognized by a wider share of European dynasts of former monarchies (no current monarch except the king of Spain has officially stated its view on the matter), namely the Count of Paris, Umberto of Italy, Gottfried of Austria-Tuscany, the Duke of Bavaria, the Duke of Württemberg, the Duke of Aosta, the Duke of Genoa, the Duke of Hohenberg, Prince Luiz of Orléans-Braganza and Prince Michael of Greece. It has been argued by some that the Counts of Paris supported the Castro line simply because their own pretence to the French throne depends entirely on the same principle of renunciation as the Act of Cannes, and so it would be against their own interest to support the legitimists. Interestingly, most of the other outspoken supporters of the Castro line were either sons-in-law of the Count of Paris or closely related to him. Up until recently, the Italian government only legally recognized Ranieri's line, but from the 1980s onwards, awards and distinctions granted by either line's representatives have been regarded as of equal legality, after careful consideration of the official documents published in 1984 by the Ministry of Justice, the Ministry of Foreign Affairs, the Council of State, the Royal Academy of Jurisprudence and Legislation and the Royal Academy of Heraldry and Genealogy. There has nonetheless been great controversy as to the Italian government's early stance, as several public officials had been accepted into the Constantinian Order by Prince Ferdinand, Duke of Castro. When the senate agreed to revise its attitude to the dispute, it considered the Calabrian line to be the legitimate, but its verdict was eventually softened to simply recognising both branches.

Honours

Dynastic
  House of Bourbon-Two Sicilies: Sovereign Knight of the Order of Saint Januarius
  House of Bourbon-Two Sicilies: Sovereign Knight Grand Cross with Collar of Justice of the Two Sicilian Sacred Military Constantinian Order of Saint George
  House of Bourbon-Two Sicilies: Sovereign Knight Grand Cross of the Order of Saint Ferdinand and Merit
  House of Bourbon-Two Sicilies: Sovereign of the Royal Order of the Two-Sicilies
  House of Bourbon-Two Sicilies: Sovereign Knight Grand Cross of the Order of Saint George of the Reunion
  House of Bourbon-Two Sicilies: Sovereign Knight Grand Cross of the Royal Order of Francis I
  Italian Royal Family: Knight of the Supreme Order of the Most Holy Annunciation
  Italian Royal Family: Knight Grand Cross of the Order of Saints Maurice and Lazarus
  Italian Royal Family: Knight Grand Cross of the Order of Merit of Savoy

National
 : Grand Cross of the Order of Merit of the Italian Republic
 : Bailiff Knight Grand Cross of Honour and Devotion of the Sovereign Military Order of Malta
 : Knight Grand Cross of the Order pro Merito Melitensi

Foreign
 : Member of the Decoration of Honour
 : Grand Cross of the Order of Vasco Núñez de Balboa, Special Class
 : Grand Cross of the Order of Civil Merit

In letters dated 21 July 2017, the Governor-General of Antigua and Barbuda issued notice that the Duke of Castro's 2014 appointment to the Order of the Nation had been annulled. The appointment of his wife was likewise annulled. In 2020, the branch of the Constantinian Order led by Prince Carlo was alleged to have influenced the election of Patricia Scotland as Commonwealth Secretary-General, which a spokesman for the Order denied, saying "These allegations are wholly offensive and wrong". It was alleged that Scotland used the Order's awards to influence votes in her favour, even though four of the five honoured national leaders had voted against her appointment.

Awards
 : Freedom of the City of London

Ancestry

References

External links
 Official Website of the Royal House of Bourbon Two Siciilies
 Official Website of the Grand Magistry of the Constantinian Order
 Official Website of the British and Irish Delegation of the Constantinian Order

1963 births
Living people
People from Saint-Raphaël, Var
Princes of Bourbon-Two Sicilies
Pretenders to the throne of the Kingdom of the Two Sicilies
French Roman Catholics
Italian people of Polish descent
French people of Polish descent
Dukes of Calabria
Dukes of Castro
Dukes of Noto
20th-century Roman Catholics
21st-century Roman Catholics
Collège Stanislas de Paris alumni

Knights Grand Cross of the Order of the Immaculate Conception of Vila Viçosa
Extraordinary Grades of the Order of Merit (Lebanon)
Knights Grand Cross of the Order of Merit of the Italian Republic
Recipients of the Order of the Nation (Antigua and Barbuda)
Recipients of the Order pro Merito Melitensi
Members of the Patriarchal Order of the Holy Cross of Jerusalem